U.S. Route 66 (US 66, Route 66) in the state of Texas extended across the Texas Panhandle from its designation in 1926 to its decommissioning in 1985.

Route description

The original US 66 followed an east-west line across the Texas Panhandle from Glenrio, New Mexico and Texas to Texola, Oklahoma. When Interstate 40 (I-40) was constructed most of the highway was upgraded in place, reducing construction costs and keeping existing towns close to the new highway to minimize tourism losses. Bypassed towns included Glenrio, Adrian, Vega, Conway, Groom, Jericho, Alanreed, McLean, and Shamrock; US 66 in each is retained as a business loop or spur of I-40. Outside of the towns, US 66 is typically retained as a frontage road for I-40.

Route 66 originally crossed from New Mexico into Texas at Glenrio, an unincorporated community founded in 1903 as a Rock Island Railroad siding. During Route 66's heyday, Glenrio's cafés, filling stations and businesses such as the First/Last Motel in Texas served travellers on the highway; after the road was bypassed in 1973, Glenrio became a ghost town.

Adrian (pop. 149) bills itself as the geographic "Midpoint of Route 66". Flo of Flo's V-8 Diner in Pixar's Cars is based on Fran Houser (who owned the Midpoint Café but has since semi-retired); the Mia and Tia characters are based on two sisters at the Midpoint Café. In Vega, Texas, the 1947 Vega Motel remains in operation as a historic motel.

Amarillo is the only major city on the Texas portion of US 66; its 6th Street Historic District includes a dozen buildings incorporating elements of Spanish Revival, Art Deco, and Art Moderne design including homes, service stations, a historic fire hall and a church. The Cadillac Ranch inspired the Cadillac Range mountains in Cars while the Tex Dinoco character adopts the appearance of the stretched, longhorn Cadillac vehicles at Amarillo's Big Texan Steak Ranch. The Ranchotel, a tourist court built in 1940 and designed architecturally to resemble a Texas ranch, was one of sixty-eight Route 66 lodgings operating in Amarillo by 1953. The building still stands in good condition but is now used as apartments.  Eastbound alignments out of include one that parallels I-40 (where one can find the Steak Ranch), while another is along I-40 business, multiplexed with US Route 60 for several miles out of town.  The original alignment was probably along 8th Avenue, but that alignment has been interrupted by Amarillo International Airport.

In Conway a portion of Route 66 from State Highway 207 (SH 207) to I-40 is listed on the National Register of Historic Places. Conway is home to The Bug Farm (with five VW Beetles buried nose down) and a trading post; the Triangle Motel is  being restored after years of resting closed, neglected and abandoned.

In Groom, Texas a leaning water tower stands empty, originally placed as an advertisement for a truck stop which burned years ago. A large crucifix serves as a local landmark. In McLean the McLean Commercial Historic District includes one of the first Phillips Petroleum stations in Texas (1929, now restored). Also in McLean is the Devils Rope Barbed Wire Museum, the Avalon Theatre and the Cactus Inn Motel.

Shamrock has restored the Tower Station and U-Drop Inn Café as a visitor centre; the Tower Station's distinctive architecture appears as Ramone's body shop in Cars. A Pioneer West Museum on two floors of the former Reynolds Hotel highlights a diversity of West Texas exhibits and the Route 66 Bridge over the Chicago, Rock Island and Gulf Railroad is listed on the National Register of Historic Places.

History

Before the U.S. Route system, this route was a system of interconnected highways from New Mexico to Oklahoma, considered a part of the Texas highway system from New Mexico to Amarillo and a portion of the Ozark Trails. In Amarillo, the Ozark route split off to a more southerly route, while general low-grade roads continued east. This entire route closely paralleled the Chicago, Rock Island and Pacific Railway.  Most construction through the Panhandle was slow, and remained low-grade roads through most of the 1920s.

In 1926, the United States Numbered Highway system was introduced, and the route across the Texas Panhandle was given the number of 66.  It was designated along already created roads in the Texas highway network. Large portions of the highway remained earthen roads until the entire route was completely paved in 1938.  A few realignments were made to the original route.  A new routing on the east side of Amarillo was completed in 1959 to make way for the expansion of the Amarillo Air Force Base, while the rest of the route through Amarillo was rebuilt on the north side of downtown.

Major intersections

Special route

Business US 66, a business loop in Amarillo, was the only special route of US 66 in Texas. The loop was a former alignment of US 66 through central Amarillo along Loop 279 and US 87 before US 66 was rerouted to the north along what is now Bus. I-40-D.

References

External links

Multiple Property Listing for Route 66 in Texas—collection of documents describing historic districts and individual properties along Route 66 on the National Register of Historic Places

 
66